Aravind Akash is an Indian actor and dancer who predominantly works in the South Indian film industry. He rose to fame through 2002 Malayalam film Nandanam portraying the role of Lord Krishna. He has also been a judge for a few TV shows in Malayalam and Tamil.

Personal life and education
He was born on 27 February 1976 in Delhi to parents from Jalandhar, Punjab. The family then moved to Chennai, Tamil Nadu. His mother was a dancer in Tamil movies. He did his primary education from Children Garden School, and Kesari Higher Secondary school. He pursued a bachelor's degree in History and took dancing lessons from Academy of Modern Dance, Chennai.

Career
Aakash Aravind had signed on to play the lead role in Kutty Padmini's production, titled Kanju Sotuthey in 2001, opposite her daughter Kirthana Udayan. Despite beginning production, the film did not have a theatrical release. His next proposed film, Agathiyan's Kadhal Samrajyam, also did not have a theatrical release despite a much-publicised production process.

Filmography

Films

Television
Serials

Shows

References

General references
Tamil Cinema News - Aravind Akash Photoshoot - Maalaimalar.com Aravind Akash Maalaimalar images

External links

Indian male television actors
Tamil male actors
Living people
Male actors in Malayalam cinema
Indian male film actors
1976 births
21st-century Indian male actors
Male actors in Malayalam television